Li Man (born 4 June 1988) is a Chinese actress. She is best known for her role in Zhang Yimou's 2006 film Curse of the Golden Flower, which boosted her to stardom. She studied at the Central Academy of Drama.

Filmography

Film

Television series

References

External links

1988 births
Living people
Actresses from Liaoning
People from Anshan
Chinese film actresses
Chinese television actresses
Central Academy of Drama alumni
21st-century Chinese actresses